The Leader of the People's Party for Freedom and Democracy is the most senior politician within the People's Party for Freedom and Democracy (VVD) in the Netherlands. The post is currently held by Mark Rutte, who succeeded Jozias van Aartsen after the leadership election of 2006 and who has also been the serving Prime Minister of the Netherlands since the Dutch general election of 2010 and was reelected as Prime Minister of the Netherlands after the Dutch general election of 2012.

History
The Leaders outwardly act as the 'figurehead' and the main representative of the party. Within the party, they must ensure political consensus. At election time the Leader is always the Lijsttrekker (top candidate) of the party list. Outside election time the Leader can serve as the Opposition leader. In the People's Party for Freedom and Democracy the Leader is often the Parliamentary leader in the House of Representatives. Some People's Party for Freedom and Democracy leaders became a Minister in a Cabinet.

Leaders

Deputy Leaders
The People's Party for Freedom and Democracy doesn't have an official designated Deputy Leader in the party's hierarchy but some are given the title as an unofficial description by the media. Because of the often unofficial nature of the position, reliable sources can sometimes differ over who the deputy actually is or was.

See also
 People's Party for Freedom and Democracy

References

External links
Official

  

 
 
People's Party for Freedom and Democracy
Netherlands politics-related lists